Kristalpark is an industrial zone situated in the province of Limburg in northeast Belgium, close to the borders of Germany, the Netherlands and France.

The total surface of Kristalpark covers 900ha (2224 acres),  one of the largest in Europe.
About 400 ha are already fully occupied by various types of industries.
The remaining surface of 500 ha (1236 acres) are available for national & international business to locate at this gateway to Europe.

Kristalpark is divided into 4 sub-zones :
 A regional business park 
 Offices & high tech activity 
 Transport, logistic & distribution 
 Mega-project area & subcontractor zone

This megazone of 90 ha contiguous industrial zone is unique in Europe.
Kristalpark has a trimodal connection with its extensive network of motorways, waterways & railways.
Since large industrial zones are rare in Belgium and Europe, Kristalpark is an additional asset for Lommel and the region.

Industry in Belgium